Bob Malmström is a Finnish-Swedish hardcore punk band. The band claims to have "the right kinds of values that emphasizes and contemptuous of the poor ‘porvaricore’, which breaks the traditional punk-left alignment pattern". The members are Carolus Aminoff, Olof Palmén, Carl Johan Langenskiöld, and Wilhelm Wahlroos.

The band released their debut album Tala svenska eller dö in 2011. Their second album, Punkens framtid, was released on 19 April 2013.

Discography
Vi är bättre än ni  (2010, EP, self-released)
Välj Malmström  (2011, EP, self-released)
Tala svenska eller dö  (2011, Spinefarm Records)
Punkens framtid  (2013, Playground Music)
Kejsarsnitt  (2015, EP, Playground)
Vi kommer i krig  (2016, Playground)
Segla med satan (2022, EP)

References

Finnish hardcore punk groups
Finland Swedish
Musical groups established in 2010
2010 establishments in Finland